"Another's Arms" is a song by British rock band Coldplay. It is the sixth track from their sixth studio album, Ghost Stories. It was written, produced, and performed by Coldplay, with co-production handled by Daniel Green, Paul Epworth, and Rik Simpson. The song debuted at number 70 on the UK Singles Chart, number 74 in Ireland and number 52 in Switzerland.

Composition
Lasting for three minutes and 54 seconds, "Another's Arms" features an arrangement of guitars, strings, "whooshing keys", "stuttering drums", a "female specter" that "croons in and out of focus", and Chris Martin's lead vocals. The song contains a vocal sample from "Silver Chord" by Jane Weaver.

Reception
Billboard writer Jason Lipshutz called "Another's Arms" "a songwriting gem", although he found the arrangement "flat". Josh Modell of The A.V. Club felt that it was "undercooked", while Consequence of Sound's Josh Terry said that the song was the "most well-crafted offering" of Ghost Stories.

Personnel
Credits are adapted from Ghost Stories liner notes.

Coldplay
Guy Berryman – bass guitar, keyboard
Jonny Buckland – electric guitar, keyboard, slide guitar
Will Champion – drums, percussion, backing vocals
Chris Martin – lead vocals, piano, keyboard

Additional musicians
John Metcalfe – strings arrangement, conductor

Technical personnel

Paul Epworth – production
Coldplay – production
Daniel Green – production
Rik Simpson – production
Mark "Spike" Stent – mixing
Geoff Swan – assistant mixing
Mike Dean – "extra magic" 
Madeon – "extra magic"
Ted Jensen – mastering
Olga Fitzroy – engineering
Matt Wiggins – engineering
Jaime Sickora – engineering
Chris Owens – engineering
Joe Visciano – engineering
Tom Bailey – additional studio assistance
Fiona Cruickshank – additional studio assistance
Nicolas Essig – additional studio assistance
Jeff Gartenbaum – additional studio assistance
Christian Green – additional studio assistance
Joseph Hartwell Jones – additional studio assistance
Pablo Hernandez – additional studio assistance
Neil Lambert – additional studio assistance
Matt McGinn – additional studio assistance
Adam Miller – additional studio assistance
Roxy Pope – additional studio assistance
John Prestage – additional studio assistance
Bill Rahko – additional studio assistance
Kyle Stevens – additional studio assistance
Dave Holmes – management

Chart positions

References

External links

2014 songs
Coldplay songs
Song recordings produced by Paul Epworth
Song recordings produced by Rik Simpson
Songs written by Chris Martin
Songs written by Guy Berryman
Songs written by Jonny Buckland
Songs written by Will Champion